TDK Akita General Sports Center is a group of sports facilities located in Nikaho, Akita, Japan.  It opened in 1985 and hosted National Sports Festival of Japan soccer games in 2007. It is the former home ground of the TDK SC and adjacent to Shirase Antaractic Expedition Memorial Museum and Nankyoku Park.

Facilities
Soccer fields
Baseball field
Swimming pool
Gymnasium
Lodge にかほ市スポーツ宿泊研修センター (run by the city)

References

External links

Blaublitz Akita
Football venues in Japan
Sports venues in Akita Prefecture
Indoor arenas in Japan
Sports venues completed in 1985
1985 establishments in Japan
Nikaho, Akita
TDK
TDK Shinwakai
Baseball venues in Japan